Hettipathirannehelage Dasarathasiri Gunawardhana is a Senior Professor of Chemistry at University of Colombo.

Early life and education

He received his primary education at Withanamulla Buddhist Mixed School Minuwangoda and entered Nalanda College Colombo for secondary education. Later he graduated with a BSc (Special) Degree from University of Ceylon, Colombo and gained a PhD for Analytical Chemistry from University of Salford in United Kingdom.

Career
Started his academic teaching career as a Temporary Assistant Lecturer at University of Ceylon, Colombo in 1970 and was appointed as a Professor of Chemistry (Inorganic / Analytical) in 1990. He is a Fellow of the Institute of Chemistry, Ceylon and Fellow of the National Academy of Sciences, Sri Lanka. He was also the Head of the Chemistry Department of University of Colombo from 1988 to 1995. He has also served as president of the Sri Lanka Association for the Advancement of Science in 2008.

References

General references 
 
 

1945 births
Sri Lankan Buddhists
Alumni of Nalanda College, Colombo
Living people
Sinhalese chemists